The Adventurer of Chad (French: L'aventurière du Tchad) is a 1953 French drama film directed by Willy Rozier and starring Madeleine Lebeau, Jean Danet and Tania Fédor.

Synopsis 
After gambling away a stolen diamond bracelet, Alain de Blomette is sent away by his father to Africa.  There, he works on a plantation, and meets Fanny. The latter's behavior ends up causing a fight between Alain and his rival, during which Fanny is killed. Alain disappears into the forest, and begins a new life in the ivory trade.

Cast
 Madeleine Lebeau as Fanny Lacour
 Jean Danet as Alain de Blomette
 Jacques Castelot
 Simone Bach
 Tania Fédor as Marjorie Kling
 Jean Clarieux
 Willy Rozier as Inspecteur Grimber

References

Bibliography 
 Rège, Philippe. Encyclopedia of French Film Directors, Volume 1. Scarecrow Press, 2009.

External links 
 

1953 films
French drama films
1953 drama films
1950s French-language films
Films set in Chad
French black-and-white films
Films directed by Willy Rozier
1950s French films
French adventure drama films